Scopula fulminataria is a moth of the family Geometridae. It is endemic to Libya.

References

Moths described in 1927
fulminataria
Endemic fauna of Libya
Moths of Africa